Gerald Patterson defeated Jack Hawkes 3–6, 6–4, 3–6, 18–16, 6–3 in the final to win the Men's Singles Tennis title at the 1927 Australian Championships.

Seeds
The seeded players are listed below. Gerald Patterson is the champion; others show the round in which they were eliminated.

 Gerald Patterson (champion)
 Jim Willard (semifinals)
 Jack Hawkes (finalist)
 Jack Crawford (quarterfinals)
 Bob Schlesinger (quarterfinals)
 Jack Cummings (third round)
 Gar Moon (semifinals)
 Pat O'Hara Wood (third round)

Draw

Key
 Q = Qualifier
 WC = Wild card
 LL = Lucky loser
 r = Retired

Final eight

Earlier rounds

Section 1

Section 2

Section 3

Section 4

External links
 

1927 in Australian tennis
Men's Singles